The Belarusian Extraleague (abbreviated BHL, also known as the Belarusian Open Championship), officially formed in 2006, is the top ice hockey league in Belarus. In its past, it has switched several times between being and not being an open league (in reference to allowing foreign teams), but for the 2008–2009 season, the Belarus Ice Hockey Federation decided to open the Belarusian Extraleague, the Belarusian Premier League and the Belarusian junior leagues.
 
Before the season 2018-2019 the Belarusian Extraleague was divided in two leagues: Extraleague A with 8 teams and Extraleague B with 9 teams. For the 2021-2022 season, this division into Extraleague A and Extraleague B was canceled, with 12 teams taking part in the single championship.

The Extraleague championships for the 2016-2017 season and 2017-2018 season were won by HC Neman Grodno

The 2019/2020 Belarusian ice hockey championship was the only championship in the world that was not interrupted due to the coronavirus pandemic.

Teams from the BHL can participate in the IIHF's annual Champions Hockey League (CHL), competing for the European Trophy. Participation is based on the strength of the various leagues in Europe (excluding the European/Asian Kontinental Hockey League). Going into the 2022–23 CHL season, the BHL was ranked the No. 7 league in Europe, allowing them to send their top team to compete in the CHL.

Current teams

2022–23 season

Former teams

Champions by season

Extraleague/Extraleague A

1992–93: Tivali Minsk
1993–94: Tivali Minsk
1994–95: Tivali Minsk
1995–96: Polimir Novopolotsk
1996–97: Polimir Novopolotsk
1997–98: Neman Grodno
1998–99: Neman Grodno
1999–2000: Tivali Minsk
2000–01: Neman Grodno
2001–02: Keramin Minsk
2002–03: HK Gomel
2003–04: Yunost Minsk
2004–05: Yunost Minsk
2005–06: Yunost Minsk
2006–07: Dinamo Minsk
2007–08: Keramin Minsk
2008–09: Yunost Minsk
2009–10: Yunost Minsk
2010–11: Yunost Minsk
2011–12: Metallurg Zhlobin
2012–13: Neman Grodno
2013–14: Neman Grodno
2014–15: HC Shakhtyor Soligorsk
2015–16: Yunost Minsk
2016–17: Neman Grodno
2017–18: Neman Grodno
2018–19: Yunost Minsk
2019–20: Yunost Minsk
2020–21: Yunost Minsk
2021–22: Metallurg Zhlobin

Extraleague B

2018–19: HC Lakamatyŭ
2019–20: HC Lakamatyŭ
2020–21: Khimik Navapolatsk

Titles by team

Extraleague/Extraleague A

Extraleague B

References

External links 
 Belarusian hockey website
 Belarusian Ice Hockey Federation - official website
 Belarus hockey archive website

 
Top tier ice hockey leagues in Europe
Professional ice hockey leagues in Belarus